is an anime series based on the manga series created by Hiroaki Samura. The series is set in Japan during the mid-Tokugawa Shogunate period and follows the cursed samurai Manji, who has to kill 1000 evil men in order to regain his mortality.

The anime is produced by Bee Train and directed by Kōichi Mashimo with production support by Production I.G and Pony Canyon. Bee Train was responsible for the animation production, Pony Canyon produced the music for the series, and Yoshimitsu Yamashita designed the characters. In North America, Media Blasters licensed the series and released it on September 29, 2009.

"Akai Usagi" was included on the CD album "Mugen no Jūnin Original Soundtrack", released on July 16, 2008, and "Wants" was released on a CD single on May 21, 2009.


Episode list

References

Blade of the Immortal episode lists